The 2015 Belgian Basketball Supercup was the 19th edition of the annual super cup game in Belgian basketball. This year reigning champions Telenet Oostende faced off against betFirst Liège, last years Cup Finalists. The game will be held in the Sleuyter Arena, which is the first time the game is held outside Knokke.

Oostende won the game 80–67, to win its 9th Supercup.

Teams

Match

References

2015
Supercup